Beijing Enlight Pictures Co., Ltd. is a Chinese film production company. In 2014, the company was the third largest film distributor in China, with 7.75% of the market. Beijing Enlight Pictures is a subsidiary of Beijing Enlight Media.

History
In 2012, the low budgeted Lost in Thailand became a local hit of China. in 2015, the broadcasting rights of Hollywood Adventures, The Left Ear and Lost in Hong Kong were acquired by Star Chinese Movies.

Filmography
Including co-productions.
 Triangle (2007 film)
 Flash Point (2007)
 Missing (2008)
 All About Women (2008)
 All's Well, Ends Well 2009 (2009)
 All's Well End's Well Too 2010 (2010)
City Under Siege (2010)
 Legend of the Fist (2010)
 The Detective 2 (2011)
Mural (2011)
Sleepwalker (2011)
Speed Angels (2011)
New Perfect Two (2012)
An Inaccurate Memoir (2012)
The Four (2012)
Beijing Blues (2012)
Sad Fairy Tale (2012)
The Assassins (2012)
The Last Tycoon (2012)
Lost in Thailand (2012)
Mid-Night Train (2013)
The Chef, the Actor, the Scoundrel (2013)
So Young (2013)
Badges of Fury (2013)
Balala the Fairies: The Magic Trial (2014)
Armor Hero Atlas (2014)
Where Are We Going, Dad? (2014)
My Old Classmate (2014)
The Four III (2014)
The Breakup Guru (2014)
Triumph in the Skies (2015)
Snow Girl and the Dark Crystal (2015)
The Left Ear (2015)
Hollywood Adventures (2015)
Balala the Fairies:The Mystery Note (2015)
The Witness (2015)
Mojin: The Lost Legend (2015)
Lost in Hong Kong (2015)
The Mermaid (2016)
Yesterday Once More (2016)
Buddies in India (2016)
Big Fish & Begonia (2016)
Throne of Elves (2016)
Crying Out In Love (2016)
I Belonged to You (2016)
Suspect X (2017)
 Ne Zha (2019)
Jiang Ziya (2020)
Shaolin Temple remake (TBA)
Black Jack film (TBA)

References

Film production companies of China
Film distributors of China